Bahamian Americans are an ethnic group of Caribbean Americans of Bahamian ancestry.  There are an estimated 56,797 people of Bahamian ancestry living in the US as of 2019.

Bahamian Immigration
Bahamians began visiting the Florida Keys in the 18th century to salvage wrecked ships, fish, catch turtles and log tropical hardwood trees. A Bahamian settlement in the Keys was reported in 1790, but the presence of Bahamians in the Keys was temporary. Early in the 19th century some 30 to 40 Bahamian ships were working in the Keys every year. After 1825, Bahamian wreckers began moving to Key West in large numbers.

Bahamians were among the first West Indians to immigrate to the mainland US in the late nineteenth century. Many went to Florida to work in agriculture or to Key West to labor in fishing, sponging, and turtling. Two main factors that contributed to increased Bahamian migration were the poor economic climate and opportunities in the Bahamas, as well as the short distance from the Bahamas to Miami.  Southern Florida developed Bahamian enclaves in certain cities including Lemon City, Coconut Grove, and Cutler. In 1896, foreign-born blacks comprised 40 percent of the black population of Miami, making Miami the largest foreign-born black city in the US aside from New York. Bahamians in Florida created their own institutions, most notably Episcopal churches. During this time in Florida, black Bahamians faced state-enforced racism. Blacks could not vote, were persecuted by epithets in Miami press, and were not allowed to stay in the hotels that employed them. In 1921, the Ku Klux Klan staged a large rally attacking Bahamian immigrants in Miami.

Between 1900 and 1920 between ten and twelve thousand Bahamians moved to Florida, mostly to do agricultural labor, often on a seasonal basis. Florida farmers convinced the U.S. Congress to exempt Caribbean and Latin American émigrés from the Emergency Quota Act of 1921. Starting in 1943 Bahamanian workers came to Florida under the British West Indian (BWI) Temporary Labor Program. This program was under the control of private growers from 1947 to 1966. Growers favored Bahamanian workers because they "can be forced to work a regular work program or be deported."

Communities
The majority of Bahamian Americans, about 21,000 in total, live in and around Miami, with the Bahamian community centered in the Coconut Grove neighborhood in Miami. There is also a growing Bahamian American population in the Atlanta and Oklahoma City areas.

Although the majority of Bahamian Americans live in the Southern United States, a large population can be found in the New York City area, with the population particularly centered in Harlem.  Bahamian Americans in the New York City area regularly provide cultural education and entertainment, particularly due to the Office of the Bahamas Consulate General in New York being located in the city.

White Bahamian Americans in Florida were often referred to as "Conchs," and their communities in Key West and Riviera Beach were sometimes referred to as "Conch Towns." In 1939, the Works Progress Administration (WPA) conducted a study of white Bahamian Americans in Riviera Beach, eventually published as Conchtown USA. Many white Bahamians also settled in Miami, particularly in the Coconut Grove neighborhood, and in Tarpon Springs.

US communities with high percentages of people of Bahamian ancestry
The top US communities with the highest percentage of people claiming Bahamian ancestry are:
 Roosevelt Gardens, Florida 9.3% 
 Canal Point, Florida 5.1% 
 Seminole Manor, Florida 3.6% 
 Brownsville, Florida 3.3% 
 Gladeview, Florida 3% 
 Archer, Florida 2.5% 
 West Park, Florida 2.1% 
 Ives Estates, Florida 2% 
 Westview, Florida 1.5% 
 Miami Gardens 1.4% 
 West Little River, Florida 1.4%

Culture
Bahamian Americans have retained much of their cultural heritage.  Bahamian Americans listen to and perform Junkanoo and rake-and-scrape music, engage in the classic art of West Indian storytelling about characters like Anansi, and create Bahamian-style art, especially straw weaving and canvas art.

Bahamian foods staples such as conch, peas and rice, Johnny cake, and desserts including duff (food)s (especially guava) continue to be made by Bahamian Americans.  Bahamian dialect is also spoken by many Bahamian Americans, especially in Florida.

Education
As of 2010, Bahamian Americans were the most educated West Indian Americans in the USA. 39.1% of the Bahamian American population of 25 years and over held college degrees. There were 22,763 Bahamian Americans 25 years and older in the country according to the 2010 census. 9.9% held associate degrees, 17.5% held bachelor's degrees, and 11.7% held graduate or professional degrees. 29.2% held bachelor's degrees or higher.

In New York State, 46.7% of Bahamian Americans 25 years and older held degrees. 18.5% held Graduate or Professional degrees, 20.6% held bachelor's degrees, with 7.6% holding associate degrees.

In Georgia 51.1% of Bahamian Americans 25 years and older held college degrees. 18.6% held Graduate or Professional degrees, 25.1% held bachelor's degrees, with 7.4% holding associate degrees.

In Florida 32% of Bahamian Americans 25 years and older held college degrees. 7.8% held Graduate or Professional degrees, 12.6% held bachelor's degrees, with 11.6% holding associate degrees.

Economy 
In 2010 census the average Bahamian American family household earned $61,070 annually, with the average household earning about $57,000. The median income for family household was $46,196 and the median for household was $42,000.

35 percent of working Bahamian Americans had occupations in Business, science, and arts, 27 percent had positions in sales and office occupations, 24 percent had occupation in service related jobs, 6 percent held jobs in natural resources, construction and maintenance, and 8% in production, transportation, and material moving.

About 20% of the Bahamian American population were living in poverty in 2010.

Organizations
Both the Bahamian American Cultural Society and the Bahamian American Association Inc., the largest Bahamian American organizations in the United States, are located in Manhattan.  These organizations provide cultural education services, social opportunities, and genealogical records to Bahamian Americans and those interested in Bahamian and Bahamian American culture.

The National Association of the Bahamas, located in Miami, offers primarily social opportunities for the local Bahamian American community.

The Council for Concerned Bahamians Abroad is a foundation which represents the interests and concerns of Bahamians, and Friends of the Bahamas domiciled outside the Bahamas. Its primary role is to serve as a voice for the economic and family interests of its constituents, and to monitor, analyze, and report on issues and policies that affect these interests. It also operates "Bring It Home Initiatives" (BIHI), projects designed to assist in the development of the Bahamas in seven areas, Education, Business & Industry, Investments & Financial Services, Health & Social Development, Community Development & Sports, Arts & Entertainment, and Tourism.

Notable Bahamian-Americans

 

 Wendy Coakley-Thompson, writer
 Tee Corinne, artist and gay rights activist
 Denzel Curry, rapper
 Rick Fox, basketball player
 Kevin "Kimbo Slice" Ferguson, mixed martial artist
 Donald R. Hopkins, public-health physician, MacArthur Fellow
 J. Rosamond Johnson, musician, composer and performer
 James Weldon Johnson, author, composer and educator 
 Lenny Kravitz, musician
 Zoë Kravitz, actress
 Shakara Ledard, model
 Alano Miller, actor
 Tahj Mowry, actor
 Tamera Mowry, actress, television host, model, author, businesswoman, singer
 Tia Mowry, actress, model, author, businesswoman, vocalist
 Sidney Poitier, actor
 Brandon Russell, Neo-Nazi leader
 Al Roker, meteorologist and television personality
 Roxie Roker, actress
 Esther Rolle, actress
 Ryan Sweeting, American professional tennis player
 Klay Thompson, NBA  basketball player
 Mychal Thompson, retired NBA basketball player 
 Trayce Thompson, MLB baseball player 
 Persia White, actress and singer
 Frederica Wilson, U.S House of Representatives from Florida's 24th district
 Bert Williams, Bahamian born American entertainer
 Michael K. Williams, actor. Mother with Bahamian roots.  
 Al Horford, NBA player with from Dominican republic with Bahamian roots
 Stepin Fetchit, first black person to become a millionaire from acting
 Eric Gordon, NBA player
 M. Athalie Range, first Black American to be elected to the Miami city commission and the first woman to head a Florida state agency.
 W.E.B Du Bois, grandfather was born in the Bahamas
 Estelle Evans, Bahamian born American Actress
 Rosanna Carter, Bahamian born American Actress
 Walter T. Mosley, legislator from the New York Assembly
 J. Gary Pretlow, legislator from the New York Assembly
 John Culmer, civil rights activist
 T-Pain, rapper

See also
 List of residents of the Bahamas
 Bahamas–United States relations

References

Further reading
 Brennan, Carol. "Bahamian Americans." Gale Encyclopedia of Multicultural America, edited by Thomas Riggs, (3rd ed., vol. 1, Gale, 2014), pp. 211-220. online

External links
 Bahamian American Association
 Bahamian American Cultural Society
 Council For Concerned Bahamians Abroad (CBA)
 Friends of The Bahamas
 National Association of the Bahamas
 Office of the Bahamas Consulate General in New York
 Online version (made available for public use by the State Archives of Florida) of a 1939 WPA exhibit on Bahamian Americans of Florida 

 
 
Caribbean American
Bahamian